Avadi City Police officially Avadi Police Commissionerate is a city police administration for the northwestern suburbs of Chennai, Tamil Nadu, India. Located in the western neighbourhood of Avadi, it was created by the trifurcation of the Greater Chennai City Police jurisdictions. Tamil Nadu State government created Tambaram and Avadi Police commissionerates in an attempt of reforming greater Chennai city police. Avadi Police Commissionerate was formally inaugurated by Chief Minister M. K. Stalin on 1 January 2022. The newly created Avadi Commissionerate jurisdiction covers twenty-five police stations from the police districts of Avadi and Redhills.

References

Government of Chennai
Metropolitan law enforcement agencies of India